Ashley Wayne Carew (born 17 December 1985) is a semi-professional footballer who plays for Haywards Heath Town as a midfielder.

Career
A midfielder, Carew began his career with Gillingham, but was released in 2004. He spent a year out of the game, returning with spells at Beckenham Town and Fisher Athletic.

He was signed by Barnet in 2007. In June 2008 he was called up to the Barbados squad to face the United States, however he turned this down because he was recovering from injury. He was a regular at right-back at the start of the 2008–09 season but soon lost his place. In January 2009 joined Eastleigh on loan, before being recalled by Barnet so they could cancel his contract. Two days later he rejoined Eastleigh on non-contract terms, before joining Bromley at the end of the season.

In August 2010 he joined Conference South side Ebbsfleet United.

On 1 July 2011, he signed a one-year deal with Conference National side Cambridge United becoming manager Jez George's eighth signing of the close season. Despite starting the 2011–12 season well and scoring regularly, the end of the season was curtailed by injury and Carew's contract at The Abbey Stadium was not renewed.

Carew signed for Isthmian League club Carshalton Athletic in the summer of 2012 and played nine times in the red of the Robins before being part of the cull that saw many players leave Colston Avenue two months into the season.

On 12 October 2012, Carew re-signed for Ebbsfleet United.

Carew was released by Ebbsfleet United in May 2013.

Prior to the start of the 2013–14 season Carew signed with Dover Athletic of the Conference South, and despite starting the season in the first team, Carew quickly fell out of favour, spending a month on loan with Whitehawk in February 2014.

Following his release by Dover Athletic at the end of the 2013–14 season, Carew signed for Dulwich Hamlet of the Isthmian League Premier Division in June 2014, finishing his first season at the club as top scorer with 12 goals, and top provider with 10 assists in all competitions, before going on to repeat the feat in his second season at the club, scoring 19 goals and providing 19 assists. His fine career with Dulwich continued in the 2016–17 season, during which he scored 14 goals and provided 15 assists, en route to winning the Supporter's Player of the Year. Carew joined Egham Town on loan in February 2019, where he also assumed the position of assistant manager.

Carew re-joined Beckenham Town for the 2019–20 season, where he was appointed captain. He joined Erith & Belvedere for the 2021-22 season, moving onto Haywards Heath Town in October.

References

External links

Profile at Barnetfc.com
Profile at Dulwich Hamlet F.C. Official Website
Career statistics

1985 births
Living people
Footballers from Lambeth
Association football midfielders
English footballers
Gillingham F.C. players
Welling United F.C. players
Worthing F.C. players
Bromley F.C. players
Sutton United F.C. players
Beckenham Town F.C. players
Fisher Athletic F.C. players
Barnet F.C. players
Eastleigh F.C. players
Ebbsfleet United F.C. players
Cambridge United F.C. players
Carshalton Athletic F.C. players
Dover Athletic F.C. players
Whitehawk F.C. players
Dulwich Hamlet F.C. players
Egham Town F.C. players
Erith & Belvedere F.C. players
Haywards Heath Town F.C. players
English Football League players
National League (English football) players
Isthmian League players
English sportspeople of Barbadian descent
Black British sportspeople